Leopold Grimard (born 1920 in St-Adrien de Ham) was a Canadian clergyman and bishop for the Roman Catholic Diocese of Idah. He was appointed prefect in 1968. He died in 1996.

References 

1920 births
1996 deaths
Canadian Roman Catholic bishops
People from Estrie